Jawabipur is a village in Dumra Block of Sitamarhi District, in Bihar, India. It is administered by the Bariarpur panchayat of Tirhut Division. Shakya chowk and Durga chowk is the famous place of Jawabipur.

Nearest railway station is Sitamarhi Junction and Dumra railway station. Pin code of Jawabipur is 843302 and postal head office is Dumra.  

Jawabipur is surrounded by Dumra Block towards South, Riga Block towards west, Bathanaha Block towards North, Bajpatti Block towards East. Sitamarhi, Sheohar, Bairgania, Muzaffarpur, Sursand, Sonwarsa, Darbhanga, Motihari, and Madhubani are the nearby cities to Jawabipur.

Historical sanctuary of Mauryan period is found near Jawabipur. Some other caste Lohara, paswan, chamar are also habitat.

References 

Villages in Sitamarhi district